The British Columbia Search and Rescue Volunteer Memorial, installed in Victoria, British Columbia, commemorates volunteers who serve, including those who died in the line of duty. The memorial was unveiled on March 2, 2017.

References

External links
 

2017 establishments in British Columbia
2017 sculptures
Monuments and memorials in British Columbia
Outdoor sculptures in Victoria, British Columbia